Arkhale may refer to:

Arkhale, Lumbini
Arkhale, Sagarmatha